Marcel Utembi Tapa (born 7 January 1959) is a Congolese Roman Catholic prelate who has served as the Archbishop of the Roman Catholic Archdiocese of Kisangani since 28 November 2008. He is also the President of the Episcopal Conference of the Democratic Republic of the Congo (Cenco) since 2016.

Previously, Utembi Tapa has served as the Bishop of the Roman Catholic Diocese of Mahagi–Nioka from 2001 to 2008.

References

External links

Living people
1959 births
Roman Catholic archbishops of Kisangani
Roman Catholic archbishops in the Democratic Republic of the Congo
Roman Catholic bishops of Mahagi–Nioka
People from Kisangani
21st-century Democratic Republic of the Congo people